Willow City is a city in Bottineau County, North Dakota, United States. The population was 149 at the 2020 census. Willow City was founded in 1887.

Geography

Demographics

2010 census
As of the census of 2010, there were 163 people, 84 households, and 47 families living in the city. The racial makeup of the city was 95.1% White, 0.6% African American, 2.5% Native American, and 1.8% from two or more races. Hispanic or Latino of any race were 0.6% of the population.

There were 84 households, of which 14.3% had children under the age of 18 living with them, 44.0% were married couples living together, 7.1% had a female householder with no husband present, 4.8% had a male householder with no wife present, and 44.0% were non-families. 40.5% of all households were made up of individuals, and 19.1% had someone living alone who was 65 years of age or older. The average household size was 1.94 and the average family size was 2.60.

The median age in the city was 51.2 years. 16% of residents were under the age of 18; 6.1% were between the ages of 18 and 24; 17.1% were from 25 to 44; 34.3% were from 45 to 64; and 26.4% were 65 years of age or older. The gender makeup of the city was 54.0% male and 46.0% female.

2000 census
As of the census of 2000, there were 221 people, 100 households, and 62 families living in the city. The population density was 486.8 people per square mile (189.6/km). There were 143 housing units at an average density of 315.0 per square mile (122.7/km). The racial makeup of the city was 92.31% White, 0.00% African American, 2.26% Native American, and 4.52% from two or more races.

There were 100 households, out of which 27.0% had children under the age of 18 living with them, 54.0% were married couples living together, 4.0% had a female householder with no husband present, and 38.0% were non-families. 35.0% of all households were made up of individuals, and 18.0% had someone living alone who was 65 years of age or older. The average household size was 2.21 and the average family size was 2.90.

In the city, the population was spread out, with 23.1% under the age of 18, 5.4% from 18 to 24, 19.5% from 25 to 44, 21.7% from 45 to 64, and 30.3% who were 65 years of age or older. The median age was 46 years. For every 100 females, there were 106.5 males. For every 100 females age 18 and over, there were 102.4 males.

The median income for a household in the city was $25,313, and the median income for a family was $34,688. Males had a median income of $28,250 versus $17,500 for females. The per capita income for the city was $11,909. About 6.7% of families and 11.8% of the population were below the poverty line, including none of those under the age of eighteen and 22.5% of those 65 or over.

Climate
This climatic region is typified by large seasonal temperature differences, with warm to hot (and often humid) summers and cold (sometimes severely cold) winters.  According to the Köppen Climate Classification system, Willow City has a humid continental climate, abbreviated "Dfb" on climate maps.

Notable people
Dick Anderson, member of the North Dakota House of Representatives
Donn J. Robertson, United States Marine Corps general

References

Cities in Bottineau County, North Dakota
Cities in North Dakota
Populated places established in 1889
1889 establishments in North Dakota